The 1973 Colgate Red Raiders football team was an American football team that represented Colgate University as an independent during the 1973 NCAA Division I football season. In its sixth season under head coach Neil Wheelwright, the team compiled a 5–5 record. Rick Horton and Tom Parr were the team captains. 

The team played its home games at Andy Kerr Stadium in Hamilton, New York.

Schedule

Leading players 
Two trophies were awarded to the Red Raiders' most valuable players in 1973: 
 Tom Parr, quarterback, received the Andy Kerr Trophy, awarded to the most valuable offensive player.
 Rick Horton, defensive back, received the Hal W. Lahar Trophy, awarded to the most valuable defensive player.

Statistical leaders for the 1973 Red Raiders included: 
 Rushing: Mark van Eeghen, 1,089 yards and 14 touchdowns on 238 attempts
 Passing: Tom Parr, 1,127 yards, 83 completions and 9 touchdowns on 165 attempts
 Receiving: Dave Lake, 433 yards and 3 touchdowns on 26 receptions
 Total offense: Tom Parr, 1,960 yards (1,127 passing, 833 rushing)
 Scoring: Mark van Eeghen, 90 points from 15 touchdowns
 All-purpose yards: Mark van Eeghen, 1,588 yards (1,089 rushing, 322 kickoff returning, 177 receiving)

References

Colgate
Colgate Raiders football seasons
Colgate Red Raiders football